Sir Bracewell Smith, 1st Baronet, KCVO (29 June 1884 – 12 January 1966) was a British businessman, Conservative Party politician and the 619th Lord Mayor of London.

Biography

Born in Keighley, Yorkshire, he attended Wesley Place Primary School in the town. He started as a pupil teacher and attended Leeds University before entering business.  He married Edith Whitaker in 1909 and had two children Eileen (born 1911) and George Bracewell Smith born in 1912.

Business

Smith made his fortune in property. In particular he was a major hotel investor/owner and who built the Park Lane Hotel in 1920.  The Bracewell Smith family also owned the Ritz Hotel which Sir Bracewell Smith's son George (but known as Guy) sold to Trafalgar House for £2.75m in 1976. They at various times had stakes in the Carlton Hotel and Hôtel Ritz Paris.

Smith was also chairman of Arsenal Football Club from 1949 until 1962, and his descendants still held a significant shareholding in the club until 2011. His grandsons Clive and Richard Carr as well as Lady Nina Bracewell-Smith, his grandson Charles' wife, currently sit on the Arsenal board.

Politics

He turned to politics and was a member of Holborn Borough Council from 1922, serving as Mayor 1931–32, and served on the London County Council 1925–28. He was Conservative Member of Parliament (MP) for Dulwich between 1932 and 1945, Sheriff of the City of London in 1943 and Lord Mayor of London in 1946. Knighted in 1945, he was created a Baronet on 28 June 1947 and was appointed a Knight Commander of the Royal Victorian Order (KCVO) in the 1948 New Year Honours.

Other

In 1958 he was made an Honorary Vice President of the Sports Turf Institute. He was also chairman of Wembley Stadium Ltd.

A freeman of Keighley (6 February 1957) he donated Cliffe Castle to the town for a museum.

The Sir Bracewell Smith Cup and rosette is awarded annually for best exhibit in the Keighley Show.

References

External links 
 

1884 births
1966 deaths
Sportspeople from Keighley
Alumni of the University of Leeds
Conservative Party (UK) MPs for English constituencies
UK MPs 1931–1935
UK MPs 1935–1945
Members of London County Council
Councillors in Greater London
Baronets in the Baronetage of the United Kingdom
Arsenal F.C. directors and chairmen
Sheriffs of the City of London
20th-century lord mayors of London
20th-century English politicians
Knights Commander of the Royal Victorian Order
Knights Bachelor